Anastasia Pavlyuchenkova was the defending champion, but chose not to participate.

Elise Mertens won the title, defeating Ajla Tomljanović in the final, 6–2, 7–6(7–4).

Seeds

Draw

Finals

Top half

Bottom half

Qualifying

Seeds

Qualifiers

Lucky losers

Draw

First qualifier

Second qualifier

Third qualifier

Fourth qualifier

References 
 Main Draw
 Qualifying Draw

Grand Prix SAR La Princesse Lalla Meryem - Singles
2018 Singles
2018 in Moroccan tennis